Matbat is a heavily Papuan-influenced Austronesian language spoken in West Papua, Indonesia, on the island of Misool, Raja Ampat islands. Its dialects are Magey and Tomolol. Similar to the neighboring Ma'ya language, Matbat is one of a handful of Austronesian languages with true lexical tone rather than a pitch-accent system or complete lack of phonemic tonal contrasts as with most other Austronesian languages.

Distribution
Matbat is spoken in the following locations within Raja Ampat Regency:

Misool Timur District: Tumolol, Lenmalas, Lenmalas Timur Barat, Audam, Foley, and Eduai villages
Misool Utara District: Atkari and Salafen villages
Misool Barat District: Magei village

Phonology 
The phonology of the Matbat language is summarized below:

Tones 
Matbat has five lexical tones: high falling  41, high  3, low rising  12, low level  1, and low falling  21, which in open syllables has a peaking allophone,  121. Most Matbat words are monosyllabic; additional syllables in polysyllabic words are often weak and toneless, though a few words do have two tonic syllables. Examples of some of the longer monomorphemic words are  'star',  'sea shore',  'round',  'butterfly'.

Evolution
Tonogenesis in Matbat remains unclear. Some Matbat reflexes of Proto-Malayo-Polynesian (PMP) proto-forms are listed below.

PMP  > Mayá  'kill'
PMP  >  'full'
PMP  >  'error'
PMP  (> ) >  'egg'
PMP  >  'die'
PMP  >  'louse'

References

Further reading

 

South Halmahera–West New Guinea languages
Languages of western New Guinea
Tonal languages in non-tonal families